Ustia is an extinct genus of biarmosuchian therapsids from the Middle Permian of Russia. It is known from a single species, Ustia atra, which was described in 2003 from an isolated lower jaw. Ustia was classified in the family Ictidorhinidae, which also includes the genus Ictidorhinus from South Africa. Both are relatively small biarmosuchians. Several other Russian therapsids known only from lower jaw bones have been placed in Ictidorhinidae, and the family is likely a paraphyletic assemblage representing a small body type than a true clade.

References

Biarmosuchians
Prehistoric therapsid genera
Guadalupian synapsids of Europe
Fossil taxa described in 2003